In Greek mythology, Antilochus (Ancient Greek: Ἀντίλοχος Antílokhos) was a prince of Pylos and one of the Achaeans in the Trojan War.

Family 
Antilochus was the son of King Nestor either by Anaxibia or Eurydice. He was the brother to Thrasymedes, Pisidice, Polycaste, Perseus, Stratichus, Aretus, Echephron and Pisistratus.

Mythology 
One of the suitors of Helen, Antilochus accompanied his father and his brother Thrasymedes to the Trojan War. When fighting there resumed after the aborted duel of Paris and Menelaus, Antilochus was first to kill a Trojan (namely Echepolus). Antilochus was distinguished for his beauty, swiftness of foot, and skill as a charioteer. Though the youngest among the Greek princes, he commanded the Pylians in the war and performed many deeds of valour. He was a favorite of the gods and a friend of Achilles, to whom he was commissioned to announce the death of Patroclus.

When his father Nestor was attacked by Memnon, Antilochus sacrificed himself to save him, thus fulfilling an oracle which had warned to "beware of an Ethiopian." Antilochus' death was avenged by Achilles, who drove the Trojans back to the gates, where he is killed by Paris. In later accounts, he was slain by Hector or by Paris in the temple of the Thymbraean Apollo together with Achilles His ashes, along with those of Achilles and Patroclus, were enshrined in a mound on the promontory of Sigeion, where the inhabitants of Ilium offered sacrifice to the dead heroes. In the Odyssey, the three friends are represented as united in the underworld and walking together in the Asphodel Meadows. According to Pausanias, they dwell together on the island of Leuke.

Among the Trojans he killed were Melanippus, Ablerus, Atymnius, Phalces, Echepolos, and Thoon, although Hyginus records that he only killed two Trojans. At the funeral games of Patroclus, Antilochus finished second in the chariot race and third in the foot race.

Antilochus left behind in Messenia a son Paeon, whose descendants were among the Neleidae expelled  from Messenia, by the descendants of Heracles.

Notes

References 

 Apollodorus, The Library with an English Translation by Sir James George Frazer, F.B.A., F.R.S. in 2 Volumes, Cambridge, MA, Harvard University Press; London, William Heinemann Ltd. 1921. ISBN 0-674-99135-4. Online version at the Perseus Digital Library. Greek text available from the same website.
Dares Phrygius, from The Trojan War. The Chronicles of Dictys of Crete and Dares the Phrygian translated by Richard McIlwaine Frazer, Jr. (1931-). Indiana University Press. 1966. Online version at theio.com
 Gaius Julius Hyginus, Fabulae from The Myths of Hyginus translated and edited by Mary Grant. University of Kansas Publications in Humanistic Studies. Online version at the Topos Text Project.
 Homer, The Iliad with an English Translation by A.T. Murray, Ph.D. in two volumes. Cambridge, MA., Harvard University Press; London, William Heinemann, Ltd. 1924. . Online version at the Perseus Digital Library.
Homer, Homeri Opera in five volumes. Oxford, Oxford University Press. 1920. . Greek text available at the Perseus Digital Library.
 Homer, The Odyssey with an English Translation by A.T. Murray, PH.D. in two volumes. Cambridge, MA., Harvard University Press; London, William Heinemann, Ltd. 1919. . Online version at the Perseus Digital Library. Greek text available from the same website.
Pausanias, Description of Greece. W. H. S. Jones (translator). Loeb Classical Library. Cambridge, Massachusetts: Harvard University Press; London, William Heinemann Ltd. (1918). Vol. 1. Books I–II: .
 Pindar, Odes translated by Diane Arnson Svarlien. 1990. Online version at the Perseus Digital Library.
 Pindar, The Odes of Pindar including the Principal Fragments with an Introduction and an English Translation by Sir John Sandys, Litt.D., FBA. Cambridge, MA., Harvard University Press; London, William Heinemann Ltd. 1937. Greek text available at the Perseus Digital Library.
 Strabo, The Geography of Strabo. Edition by H.L. Jones. Cambridge, Mass.: Harvard University Press; London: William Heinemann, Ltd. 1924. Online version at the Perseus Digital Library.
 Strabo, Geographica edited by A. Meineke. Leipzig: Teubner. 1877. Greek text available at the Perseus Digital Library.
 

Suitors of Helen
Achaean Leaders
Children of Nestor (mythology)
Pylian characters in Greek mythology
People of the Trojan War
Mythology of Pylos